Starting with 18 member states, soon all member states of the Council of Europe joined the Venice Commission. Since 2002, non-European states can also become full members. As of 13 June 2014, the commission has 60 member states.

Full members
The 18 founding members:

 
 
 
 
 
 
 
 
 
 
 
 
 
 
 
 
 
 

The 29 other member states of the Council of Europe:

 
 
 
 
 
 
 
 
 
 
 
 
 
 
 
 
 
 
 
 
 
 
 
 
 
 
    
 

Other member states (mostly outside of Europe), with their year of accession:

  2004
  2005
  2006
  2007
  2007
  2008
  2009
  2009
  2010
  2010 
  2012
 
  2014 
  2019

Associate members
  is an associate member

Observers
Observer members include:

Special status
Special co-operation status (similar to that of observer status):
  European Commission
  Palestinian National Authority
 

In addition, the EU Committee of the Regions, OSCE/ODIHR and IACL/AIDC (The International Association of Constitutional Law | Association internationale de droit constitutionnel) participate in the plenary sessions of the commission.

See also

Council of Europe

References

Venice Commission